Trigonopterus is a genus of flightless weevils placed in the Cryptorhynchinae of Curculionidae. It is distributed in Australia, Indonesia and Melanesia. About 90 species had been formally described until March 2013, when a single paper more than doubled this number, agreeing with previous studies and a systematic barcoding study that many more species have yet to be described. As of October 2021, there were 480 described species.

The center of its diversity appears to be New Guinea where 51 or more species can be found in a single locality. Many of them are very similar to each other, but male genital characters and DNA barcoding allow a safe identification.

In January 2016, a paper was published that revised the Australian species within this genus. That paper described 24 new species and indicated the potential for more research into undescribed Australian species within this genus.

In April 2016, a paper was published that described four new species in this genus from the island of New Britain. The paper postulated that more species of this genus presently unknown to science may exist on the island. It emphasised the importance of prioritising further research due to the ongoing destruction of the habitat of these species.

Further papers described 133 new species from Sulawesi, where only one species (T. fulvicornis) had previously been recorded.

The genus can be diagnosed among wingless cryptorhynchine weevils by the absence of a metanepisternum and by a synapomorphic structure of the tarsus with minute claws and a deeply incavated articulation of tarsomere 4. The metathoracic spiracle located externally at the side of the metaventrite is a unique feature and may ensure sufficient respiration during thanatosis.

Trigonopterus species inhabit primary tropical forests, both on foliage and edaphic in the litter layer. They have a marked tendency to endemism with many species only known from a single locality. Their primary defence against predators is apparent death or thanatosis. An animated 3D model of a Trigonopterus weevil reveals a number of mechanisms to maintain a stable defensive position.

Biological screw joint

The arthropod hip-leg joint consists of two parts - the coxa (or the hip) and the trochanter (or the head of the arthropod leg femur). The coxa, in the case of Trigonopterus oblongus, resembles a nut, and it has a thread running along its inner surface with an angular span of 345°. The trochanter resembles the screw. It is rod-shaped with a large external spiral flange, having an angular span of 410°, in excess of a full circle, which functions as a thread. When the leg muscles of a beetle are stretched, the screw turns. Though the screw-thread provide for very large angular rotation, the front legs are capable of rotating by 90°, while their hind legs can rotate by 130°.

Evolution
The screw-and-nut system has now been found to be present in all 15 weevil species examined by the scientists and appears to be a hitherto unknown anatomical feature of weevils. It has been estimated that weevils evolved this system about 100 million years ago. It is surmised that the development of this feature provided additional flexibility which permitted weevils to improve their climbing abilities, helped them keep steady when at rest, and to give a stronger leverage for piercing by the snout.

Species

Gallery

References

 
Beetles of Asia
Taxa named by Charles Adolphe Albert Fauvel